Coxcomb may refer to:

 Coxcomb (ornithology), a fleshy growth on the top of the head of many gallinaceous birds
 Coxcomb (plant) or Celosia, a small genus of edible and ornamental plants
 The Coxcomb, an early Jacobean era stage play
 The Coxcomb (album), 1999 album by David Grubbs
 Fop or coxcomb, 17th century slang for a man overly concerned with his appearance
 A type of crystal habit in minerals
 A type of cap and bells or fool's hat

See also 
 Cockscomb (disambiguation)
 Coxcomb diagram or polar area diagram, a type of pie chart attributed to Florence Nightingale
 Coxcomb Mountains, mountain range of southern California
 Coxcomb Peak, a dolerite elevation in Antarctica
 Coxcomb Peak (Colorado), a mountain in Colorado, US
 Coxcomb prominent, a moth